The 1959 Southern Area League was the final season of the Southern Area League as the regional second tier of speedway racing in the United Kingdom for Southern British teams. With no league in 1958, a set of 6 new teams competed in 1959.

Summary
Eastbourne Eagles were the champions, Southern Rovers withdrew after just one league meeting.

Final table

Southern Rovers withdrew after one meeting - record expunged.

See also
List of United Kingdom Speedway League Champions
Knockout Cup (speedway)

References

Southern Area League
1959 in British motorsport
1959 in speedway